Big black cock, usually shortened to BBC, is a sexual slang and genre of ethnic pornography, that focuses on Black men with large penises. The stereotype of larger penis size in black men has been subjected to scientific scrutiny, with inconclusive results. The theme is found in both straight and gay pornography.

Description
Most commonly, black men are expected to be hyper-masculine and hyper-sexual, and their fetishization is seen predominately throughout porn and the "BBC" (big black cock) category, which reinforces the idea that they should have a large penis. As the word "dick" is used much more frequently than "cock" in African American English, the phrase BBC, which ranks among the most searched categories on PornHub as of 2019, is asserted to have originated from white fetishization of interracial pornography involving black males. The stereotype of larger penis size in black men has been subjected to scientific scrutiny, with inconclusive results. Furthermore, within porn videos, the black male is expected to be rough and sexually dominant, acting in almost a primitive manner. This reflects the prominent "Mandingo" stereotype of black men, dating back to the time of slavery. Black actors in porn have been calling out issues with filming on social media, bringing attention to the common but outdated practice whereby a white performer charges a higher rate for interracial (IR) scenes, to which Isiah Maxwell states "IR is a smokescreen for what you're really trying to say ... it doesn't mean Asian or Latino. It means, 'Are you willing to have sex with a black guy?'"

The aspect of the black male being a performer under the "white gaze", according to psychiatrist and political philosopher Frantz Fanon, can be manifested through the sporting body and their representation within the sphere of athleticism. Ben Carrington further elaborates on this in his article Race, representation and the sporting body whereby "Blackness itself was pathologized as a deviant identity, and the black male was stereotyped (and subsequently mythologized) as a hyper-sexed, almost animal-like, entity." (Carrington, 2002). This idea that the black man has to possess animalistic behaviour is explained in more detail by Carrington, explaining that "Black athletes – female and male ─ are invariably described as being strong, powerful and quick but with unpredictable and "wild" moments when they supposedly lack the cognitive capabilities – unlike their white peers – to have 'composure' at critical moments". Just as Fanon talks about the white gaze, Carrington presents the view that representation in the media (both in sports and pornography) leaves the black male body vulnerable and exposed to inspection.

The stereotype appears in gay, bisexual, and straight media, with the "BBC" acronym also being "ubiquitous among gay men on dating sites, in pornography, and in other gay sexual spaces. Its use extends beyond penis size itself to encompass a number of sexual traits that would establish Black men as prized sexual partners. It often includes specific mention of dominance, aggressiveness, and submission of the White partner". The term also appears in connection with cuckoldry fetishism.

History

Whilst the term BBC originated in the early 2000s with the development of Internet pornography, the stereotype of black men having large penises dates from much earlier, and reflects the prominent "Mandingo" stereotype of black men, dating back to the time of slavery.

Reception
The term is considered by some to carry racist connotations, to embody the fetishization of black men, and to perpetuate harmful stereotypes about the physical features and sexual appetites and inclinations of black men.

Writer and activist Rhammel said that he had found that "my worth is often only perceived sexually. There are always references to me having a 'BBC' (big black c*ck)".

The Gay Times reported that "seeing Black men in porn labelled as ‘Thugs’ or, ‘BBC’ (to name but two harmful categorisations) or ‘Black [insert search term] has off-line and real-world psychological consequences".

Jason Okundaye, writing for GQ, said that "the problem of fetishising black masculinity goes beyond being treated as a walking black dildo by overzealous white people", asserting that "the over-sexualisation of black masculinity has, historically, led to intense surveillance and intervention over our bodies".

See also

 Race and sexuality
 Ethnic pornography
 Sexual fetishism
 Stereotypes of African Americans

References

Sexual slang
Black (human racial classification)
Pornography